William Delany  (25 December 1804, Bandon, County Cork – 14 November 1886, Cork) was an Irish Roman Catholic bishop.

Delany was ordained a priest on 8 January 1828. He received the degree of Doctor of Divinity (DD). His first appointment was as chaplain at Cork City Jail. Later he was parish priest in his home town of Bandon until his episcopal appointment. He was consecrated Bishop of Cork on 15 September 1847. In 1881, he demoted two priests who espoused the cause of Irish nationalism.

References

1804 births
1886 deaths
19th-century Roman Catholic bishops in Ireland
Roman Catholic bishops of Cork